The Pakistan national rugby sevens team first took part in the 2006 Singer Sevens in Kandy, Sri Lanka. Playing three matches, they lost all three, against the Arabian Gulf, hosts Sri Lanka and India respectively, failing to register a single point in the process.

Results

2009

2010

 Pakistan wins in bold.

References

Rugby union in Pakistan
National rugby sevens teams
Rugby